Churchill Apartments is a 310-ft (95 m) skyscraper in Minneapolis, Minnesota. It was built in 1981 and has 33 floors. It is the 33rd-tallest building in the city.

The opening scene of the movie Young Adult was filmed in various units of the building.

See also
List of tallest buildings in Minneapolis

References
Skyscraperpage

Apartment buildings in Minnesota
Residential buildings completed in 1981
Residential skyscrapers in Minneapolis